Bhanu Bandyopadhyay, also known as Bhanu Banerjee (born as Samyamoy Bandyopadhyay; 26 August 1920 – 4 March 1983), was an Indian actor, known for his work in Bengali cinema. He acted in over 300 movies, in numerous plays and performed frequently on the radio.

Early life 
Bhanu Bandyopadhyay was born on 26 August 1920 at Dhaka town, Bengal in a Kulin Brahmin family. His ancestral home was at a village called Panchgaon in Bikrampur, Dhaka Division, present day Bangladesh. Bhanu Banerjee was related to Sabitri Chatterjee through his maternal side. Aghorenath Chattopadhyay was his maternal grandfather's cousin. He studied at Kazi Pagla A. T. Institute, Lohajong, Pogose School and St. Gregory's High School in Dhaka followed by Jagannath College for his B.A.  He then moved to Calcutta in the 1950s. In his initial years Bandyopadhyay worked at the Iron & Steel Control Board.

Political activity 

He was associated with the freedom fighter group Anushilan Samity in the Dhaka Dist. He was kept under house arrest for 30 days when he was a teenager as the police suspected him to be involved in seditious activities. After the Quit India movement he joined with the Revolutionary Socialist Party. Later founded the Kranti Shilpi Sangha with writer (later film maker) Salil Sen, staging the latter’s landmark play Natun Yahudi (1951, filmed 1953) about East Bengal refugees for fund-raising on their behalf in Calcutta.

Career 
Bandyopadhyay started his acting career as a stand-up comedian in Dhaka. He performed at office parties and then moved on to larger venues. In 1943, he released his first major comic gramophone record Dhakar Gadoane. Its success prompted him to release a new record every year during Durga Puja. He made his big screen debut with Debi Mukherjee and Sumitra Devi starrer Bengali film Abhijog (1947). Bandyopadhyay's breakthrough film role was in Nirmal Dey's Basu Parivar (1952) where he played a Bangal businessman. The next year his role as Kedar in Sharey Chuattor made him rise to fame. His quote in the film Mashima,  malpoa khamu.  (Aunty, I want to eat malpoa) became a popular catchphrase. He went on to act in over 300 movies like Bhrantibilash and Pasher Bari. In most of his films he played comedic roles in which he exaggerated Bengali accents and mannerisms for comic effect. He teamed up with his best friend comedian Jahor Roy for many films like Bhanu Pelo Lottery and the humorous detective story Bhanu Goenda Johar Assistant.  Typically, in the pair's films Bandyopadhyay would take the role of the Bangal and Roy would be the comical Ghoti character (although in real life, both were Bangals). Although chiefly known as a comedian, Bandyopadhyay played serious roles in the film Galpo Holeo Satti , Alor Pipasa , Amrita Kumbher Sandhane ; Nirdharito shilpir onuposthitite , and even negative roles in Baghini (1968 film) and Bijayinee movie. He played the lead roles in Jamalaye Jibanta Manush, Mriter morte Agomon, Sworgo Mortyo, personal assistant, Miss Priyambada and Ashite Ashiona. Later in his career Bandyopadhyay founded his own Jatra group called Mukto Mancha. He produced, directed and acted in his own productions, traveling around the country with the troupe.

Personal life 
Bandyopadhyay was married to Nilima Mukhopadhyay, a playback singer. They had three children – Basabi Ghatak (née Bandyopadhyay), Gautam and Pinaki. Earlier the family stayed in Jubilee Park, Tollygunge. Later shifted to 42A, Charu Avenue, Rabindra Sarobar in 1960.

Death and legacy 
Bandyopadhyay died of a heart-related illness on 4 March 1983. On 26 August 2011 his film Nirdharito Shilpir Onupasthitite (1959) was released on DVD. His son, Gautam Bandyopadhyay, has confirmed the release which coincided with his father's 91st birth anniversary.

Works

Filmography

Records (Comedy audio clips)

References

External links 
 Official website
 

1920 births
1983 deaths
Male actors in Bengali cinema
Indian stand-up comedians
Bengali male television actors
Indian male radio actors
People from Dhaka
Male actors from Kolkata
20th-century Indian male actors
20th-century comedians
People from British India
St. Gregory's High School and College alumni
Pogose School alumni